Padra is one of the 182 Legislative Assembly constituencies of Gujarat state in India. It is part of the Vadodara district.

List of segments
This assembly seat represents the following segments,

 Padra Taluka - Mujpur, Dabka, Chokari, Mahmadpura, Ekalbara
 Vadodara Taluka (Part) Villages – Sindhrot, Hinglot, Ampad, Mahapura, Sevasi, Khanpur
 Karjan Taluka (Part) Village – Umaj

Members of Legislative Assembly
2007 - Dineshbhai Patel, Independent
2012 - Dineshbhai Patel, Bharatiya Janata Party

Election results

2022

2017

2012

See also
 List of constituencies of Gujarat Legislative Assembly
 Gujarat Legislative Assembly

References

External links
 

Assembly constituencies of Gujarat
Vadodara district